Rzemień  is a village in the administrative district of Gmina Przecław, within Mielec County, Subcarpathian Voivodeship, in south-eastern Poland. Rzemień is situated in the valley of the Wisłoka River. It has a large windmill and a large park in which stands an interesting example of early fortification, a tall square building, with 2 meter thick walls.

History

The fortification is said to have been built by Stanisław Tarnowski in 1526. A manuscript (Document N°. 1826), by the Reverend Franciszek Siarczyński in the Ossolineum library, in Wrocław, Poland records that this village belonged a family called Ocieski, who were major landowners in the area (also owning Ocieka and Wola Ociecka). In 1616 the castle fortification ownership passed to the Lubomirski family, who in 1620-1640 modernised it with the most up-to-date defences.

References

Notes

Villages in Mielec County